The Perry Public School District is located in Perry, Oklahoma, United States. The Perry school district has four schools.

The district is managed by the Superintendent Dr. Terry McCarty, who works under the direction of a five-person board. Before becoming the superintendent of Perry Public Schools, McCarty was the assistant superintendent of Stillwater Public Schools.

The mascot of both the district and the high school is the Maroon.

Schools

High school
 Perry High School (Grades 9-12)

Middle school
 Perry Junior High School (Grades 7-8)

Elementary schools
 Perry Upper Elementary School (Grades 3-6)
 Perry Lower Elementary School (Grades PK-2)

References

External links
 

School districts in Oklahoma
Education in Noble County, Oklahoma